Vegår is a lake in the municipality of Vegårshei in Agder county, Norway.

The three largest parts of the lake are named Vestfjorden, Nordfjorden, and Sørfjorden. There are many small islands in the lake, the largest of which is Furøya. The primary exit for the water in the lake is through the river Storelva which flows south through the village of Myra to Nesgrenda in Tvedestrand municipality before turning northeast and flowing into the sea at the Sandnesfjorden.

Vegår supports one of the country's most long-lived and stable beaver populations, as well as a fish fauna consisting of European perch, brown trout, Arctic char, and European eel.

Media gallery

See also
List of lakes in Aust-Agder
List of lakes in Norway

References

Lakes of Agder
Vegårshei